Moez Echargui (born 10 January 1993) is a Tunisian tennis player.

Echargui has a career high ATP singles ranking of 339 achieved on 17 December 2018. He also has a career high ATP doubles ranking of 362 achieved on 27 May 2019.

Echargui represents Tunisia at the Davis Cup where he has a W/L record of 3–4.

Challenger and Futures/World Tennis Tour finals

Singles: 17 (8–9)

Doubles: 19 (8–11)

Davis Cup

Participations: (3–4)

   indicates the outcome of the Davis Cup match followed by the score, date, place of event, the zonal classification and its phase, and the court surface.

References

External links
 
 
 

1993 births
Living people
Nevada Wolf Pack athletes
Tunisian male tennis players
People from La Marsa
21st-century Tunisian people